Lawrence P. Kelly (December 18, 1913 –  August 23, 1999) was an American accountant and business manager from Cudahy, Wisconsin who served one term (1963-1964) as a Democratic member of the Wisconsin State Assembly from Milwaukee County's 24th district.

Born in Sparta, Wisconsin, Kelly moved to Cudahy with his family. He managed movie theaters. He also served as mayor of Cudahy 1964–1988.

References

1913 births
American accountants
Businesspeople from Wisconsin
Mayors of places in Wisconsin
People from Cudahy, Wisconsin
People from Sparta, Wisconsin
1999 deaths
20th-century American businesspeople
20th-century American politicians
Democratic Party members of the Wisconsin State Assembly